Bonnie Tan (born September 9, 1972) is a Filipino basketball coach. He is the head coach for the Colegio de San Juan de Letran's men's basketball team of the National Collegiate Athletic Association (Philippines) (NCAA) and interim head coach for NorthPort Batang Pier of the Philippine Basketball Association (PBA) since 2014. He is also a Freemason of the Grand Lodge of the Philippines.

Career

Playing career 
In 1988, Tan played under Alfrancis Chua's Grace Christian High School (now Grace Christian College). Tan then played for the UST Growling Tigers under Aric del Rosario from 1991 to 1992.

Coaching career

Beginnings 
In 1991, Tan served as Goldwin Monteverde's assistant in Saint Stephen's High School's developmental team, while studying in UST. After two years, Tan left Saint Stephen's to return to his alma mater Grace Christian High School to serve as its elementary school coach.

Lyceum Pirates 
He then served as Lyceum Pirates' head coach for more than a decade. Tan coached Lyceum to two unbeaten seasons in the Inter-Scholastic Athletic Association, and qualified to four straight Philippine Collegiate Champions League tournaments. Tan guided the Pirates in the transition from when they became a guest team in the NCAA in 2011. The Pirates, with the exception of 2011 when they finished last, were a mid-table team during Tan's tenure. He resigned in 2014 after the Pirates finished NCAA Season 90 just outside playoff contention.

He was reportedly considered to be the head coach of the UST Growling Tigers midway the 2017 season, but declined out of respect to then current coaching staff; Tan himself denied being approached by UST.

Letran Knights 
Tan was then appointed head coach of the Letran Knights in 2019. In his first game, Tan coached Letran to a loss against his former team Lyceum. Tan ultimately led the Knights to its first title in four seasons by winning the NCAA Season 95 championship.

At the height of COVID-19 pandemic, Alfrancis Chua, Letran's special assistant to the rector for sports development, denied Tan will be replaced by just resigned UST Growling Tigers coach Aldin Ayo. Ayo previously led Letran to a title in 2015, and just led the Tigers to a runner-up finish in the previous UAAP season. Days later, Tan announced the transfer of three UST players to Letran.

In the 2021 PBA All-Filipino Cup, Tan coached the NorthPort Batang Pier of the Philippine Basketball Association for three games when its entire coaching staff were not cleared from health and safety protocols due to the COVID-19 pandemic. Tan coached the team to three victories before being replaced by head coach Pido Jarencio.

With the 2020 NCAA season canceled, and the 2021 season delayed to early 2022, Tan coached Letran to a second consecutive title. The Knights had a perfect season, winning all nine elimination round games, and all three playoff games. Rhenz Abando, one of the transferees from UST, was named the NCAA's Rookie of the Year and Most Valuable Player. In the 2022 season done just months later, Letran successfully defended the title, winning its third consecutive title.

Weeks after winning his third NCAA title, Tan was named interim head coach of NorthPort Batang Pier, replacing Jarencio, who then replaced Tan as NorthPort's team manager.

Managerial career 
Tan is the team manager of NorthPort Batang Pier in the PBA. In 2022, during the contract renewal talks concerning Robert Bolick, he convinced Bolick to stay with NorthPort despite offers from teams from other countries. Meanwhile, for Greg Slaughter's contract, Slaughter denied Tan's claims that he is demanding a contract that's more than the league maximum.

Tan is also the tournament director of the Metro Basketball Tournament since 2017, which has since been remained as the "M-League," supported by the PBA and the Metropolitan Manila Development Authority.

Coaching record

College

PBA

References 

Filipino men's basketball coaches
Living people
UST Growling Tigers basketball players
Filipino people of Chinese descent
Lyceum Pirates basketball coaches
Letran Knights basketball coaches
1972 births
NorthPort Batang Pier coaches